, or JH, was a  public company established after World War II to construct and manage highway networks in Japan, founded in 1956.

On October 1, 2005, JH was divided into three private enterprises, East Nippon Expressway Company Limited (NEXCO East), Central Nippon Expressway Company Limited (NEXCO Central), and West Nippon Expressway Company Limited (NEXCO West).

References

Expressway companies of Japan
Transport companies based in Tokyo
Transport companies established in 1956
Japanese companies established in 1956
Transport companies disestablished in 2005
Japanese companies disestablished in 2005